Type V collagen is a form of fibrillar collagen associated with classical Ehlers-Danlos syndrome. It is found within the dermal/epidermal junction, placental tissues,  as well as in association with tissues containing type I collagen.

Autoimmunity against type V collagen is associated with lung transplant failure.

Genes
 COL5A1, COL5A2, COL5A3

References

External links
 

Collagens